Pascal Berger (born March 24, 1989) is a Swiss professional ice hockey player who is currently playing as captain for the SCL Tigers in the National League (NL). Pascal's brother Alain Berger plays for SC Bern, he returned to Switzerland after an unsuccessful stint in North America within the Montreal Canadiens organization.

Career statistics

Regular season and playoffs

International

References

External links

1989 births
Living people
SC Bern players
SC Langenthal players
SCL Tigers players
Swiss ice hockey forwards
People from Burgdorf, Switzerland
Sportspeople from the canton of Bern